Papuina is a genus of air-breathing land snails, terrestrial pulmonate gastropod mollusks in the subfamily Hadrinae of the family Camaenidae.

Species
Species within the genus Papuina include:

 Papuina abbasi Thach, 2016
 Papuina abbasiana Parsons, 2019
 Papuina acmella (Pfeiffer, 1860)
 Papuina acuta (Quoy & Gaimard, 1832)
 Papuina adonis (Angas, 1869)
 Papuina antiqua (A. Adams & Reeve, 1850)
 Papuina aurora Pfeiffer, 1862
 Papuina bartletti Cotton, 1941
 Papuina blainvillei (Le Guillou, 1842)
 Papuina blanfordiana (H.Adams, 1865)
 Papuina bougainvilliana I. Rensch, 1934
 Papuina brodiei (Brazier, 1872)
 Papuina caerulescens (Angas, 1870)
 Papuina canovarii (Tapparone-Canefri, 1883)
 Papuina christae Falconieri, 1996
 Papuina comriei (Angas, 1876) (species inquirendum)
 Papuina dampieri (Angas, 1869)
 Papuina donnaisabellae (Angas, 1869)
 Papuina eddystonensis (Reeve, 1854)
 Papuina eros (Angas, 1867)
 Papuina eyerdami I. Rensch, 1934
 Papuina exsultans (Tapparone-Canefri, 1883)
 Papuina fakfakensis Thach, 2020
 Papuina fallax Fulton, 1904
 Papuina flexilabris (Pfeiffer, 1856)
 Papuina franzhuberi Thach, 2018
 Papuina fringilla (Pfeiffer, 1855)
 Papuina gamelia (Angas, 1867)
 Papuina gelata (Cox, 1873)
 Papuina goldiei (Brazier, 1881)
 Papuina groulti (Dautzenberg, 1902)
 Papuina guadalcanarensis (Cox, 1871)
 Papuina gudei Vernhout, 1912
 Papuina guppyi (E. A. Smith, 1885)
 Papuina gurgustii (Cox, 1879)
 Papuina hargreavesi (Angas, 1869)
 Papuina hedleyi (E. A. Smith, 1892)
 Papuina hellwigensis Schepman, 1919
 Papuina hermione (Angas, 1869)
 Papuina hero (E.A.Smith, 1891) (species inquirendum)
 Papuina incerta I. Rensch, 1929
 Papuina jensi Falconieri, 1996
 Papuina johnabbasi Thach, 2020
 Papuina johnabbasiana Thach, 2020
 Papuina juttingae Mienis, 1993
 Papuina kapaurensis E. A. Smith, 1897
 Papuina labium (Ferussac, 1822)
 Papuina lacteolata japenensis Benthem-Jutting, 1965
 Papuina lanceolata (L. Pfeiffer, 1862)
 Papuina lepida Fulton, 1916
 Papuina leucorhaphe Möllendorff, 1899
 Papuina leucothoe (Pfeiffer, 1861)
 Papuina lienardiana (Crosse, 1864)
 Papuina linterae Möllendorff, 1897
 Papuina lituus (Lesson, 1831)
 Papuina lorentzi Schepman, 1919 
 Papuina malantanensis (Adams & Angas, 1876)
 Papuina mayri (Rensch, 1934)
 Papuina mendana (Angas, 1867)
 Papuina mendoza (Brazier, 1872)
 Papuina meta (Pfeiffer, 1856)
 Papuina migratoria (Pfeiffer, 1855)
 Papuina molesta E.A.Smith, 1897 (taxon inquirendum)
 Papuina motacilla (L. Pfeiffer, 1855)
 Papuina mysolensis (Pfeiffer, 1862)
 Papuina nigrofasciata (Pfeiffer, 1864)
 Papuina nodifera (Pfeiffer, 1861)
 Papuina novoguineensis (Pfeiffer, 1862)
 Papuina obiensis (Dautzenberg, 1902)
 Papuina papuensis (Quoy & Gaimard, 1832)
 Papuina pelechystoma (Tapparone Canefri, 1880)
 Papuina phaecostoma (von Martens, 1877)
 Papuina phaecostoma fulgurata Rolle, 1902
 Papuina philomela (Angas, 1872)
 Papuina pileolus (Férussac, 1821)
 Papuina pileus (Muller, 1774)
 Papuina piliscus (E. von Martens, 1898)
 Papuina plagiostoma (Pfeiffer, 1856)
 Papuina pseudolabium (Pfeiffer, 1868)
 Papuina pseudolanceolata Dautzenberg, 1903
 Papuina pseudosatsuma Möllendorff, 1902
 Papuina redempta (Cox, 1873)
 Papuina rhynchostoma (L. Pfeiffer, 1861)
 Papuina rianae Delsaerdt, 2012
 Papuina sachalensis (Pfeiffer, 1855)
 Papuina schafferyi Iredale, 1940
 Papuina smithi Boettger, 1919
 Papuina spectrum (Reeve, 1845)
 Papuina spectrum wallaceana Sykes, 1903
 Papuina splendescens (Cox, 1865)
 Papuina stevenliei Thach, 2021
 Papuina steursiana (Pfeiffer, 1853)
 Papuina steursiana concolor (E.A.Smith, 1897)
 Papuina subcostata Fulton, 1916
 Papuina suprapicta Fulton, 1905
 Papuina tabarensis warreni Clench & Turner, 1964
 Papuina translucida (Quoy & Gaimard, 1832)
 Papuina trochiformis Preston, 1903 (taxon inquirendum)
 Papuina vexillaris (Pfeiffer, 1855)
 Papuina vitrea (A. Férussac, 1821)
 Papuina walleri Brazier, 1833
 Papuina weeksiana M. Smith, 1946
 Papuina wollastoni Robson, 1914

Species brought into synonymy
 Papuina admiralitatis (Rensch, 1931): synonym of Megalacron admiralitatis (I. Rensch, 1931) (original combination)
 Papuina albocarinata (E.A.Smith, 1887): synonym of Rhynchotrochus albocarinatus (E. A. Smith, 1887)
 Papuina alfredi (Cox, 1871): synonym of Megalacron alfredi (Cox, 1871) (superseded combination)
 Papuina ambrosia (Angas, 1867): synonym of Megalacron ambrosia (Angas, 1868)
 Papuina arrowensis (Le Guillou, 1842): synonym of Dendrotrochus arrowensis (Le Guillou, 1842)
 Papuina bequaerti (Clench & Turner, 1964): synonym of Megalacron bequaerti Clench & Turner, 1964
 Papuina boivini (Petit, 1841): synonym of Megalacron boivini (Petit de la Saussaye, 1841)
 Papuina brumeriensis (Forbes, 1852): synonym of Letitia brumeriensis (Forbes, 1851)
 Papuina buehleri (Rensch, 1933): synonym of Forcartia buehleri (Rensch, 1933)
 Papuina chancei (Cox, 1870): synonym of Papustyla chancei (Cox, 1870)
 Papuina cynthia (Fulton, 1902): synonym of Canefriula cynthia (Fulton, 1902) (original combination)
 Papuina globula (Rensch, 1930): synonym of Forcartia globula (I. Rensch, 1930) (original combination)
 Papuina hindei (Cox, 1888): synonym of Papustyla hindei (Cox, 1886)
 Papuina klaarwateri (Rensch, 1931): synonym of Megalacron klaarwateri (I. Rensch, 1931)
 Papuina kubaryi Möllendorf, 1895: synonym of Rhynchotrochus kubaryi (Möllendorff, 1895)
 Papuina lambei (Pfeiffer, 1856): synonym of Megalacron lambei (Pfeiffer, 1856)
 Papuina lambei mahurensis Rehder, 1934: synonym of Megalacron tabarensis (I. Rensch, 1933) 
 Papuina lambei novohibernica M.Smith, 1946: synonym of Megalacron lambei (Pfeiffer, 1856)
 Papuina lilium (Fulton, 1905): synonym of Papustyla lilium (Fulton, 1905) (original combination)
 Papuina louisiadensis(Forbes, 1852): synonym of Rhynchotrochus louisiadensis (Forbes, 1852)
 Papuina lufensis Thiele, 1928: synonym of Megalacron lufensis (Thiele, 1928) (original combination)
 Papuina macgillivrayi (Forbes, 1852): synonym of Rhynchotrochus macgillivrayi (Forbes, 1852)
 Papuina melanesia (Clench & Turner, 1964): synonym of Megalacron melanesia Clench & Turner, 1964
 Papuina miser (Cox, 1873): synonym of Papuina meta (L. Pfeiffer, 1856)
 Papuina misima (Iredale, 1941): synonym of Rhynchotrochus misima (Iredale, 1941)
 Papuina naso (von Martens, 1894): synonym of Rhynchotrochus naso (von Martens, 1883)
 Papuina novaegeorgensis (Cox, 1870): synonym of Megalacron novaegeorgiensis (Cox, 1870)
 Papuina (Pinnadena) periwonensis Dell, 1955: synonym of Megalacron periwonensis (Dell, 1955)
 Papuina phaeostoma (Pfeiffer, 1877): synonym of Megalacron phaeostoma (Pfeiffer, 1877)
 Papuina pulcherrima Rensch, 1931: synonym of Papustyla pulcherrima (I. Rensch, 1931) (original combination)
 Papuina sellersi (Cox, 1872): synonym of Megalacron sellersi (Cox, 1872)
 Papuina spadicea Fulton, 1902: synonym of Megalacron spadicea (Fulton, 1902) (original combination)
 Papuina spadicea dunkeri (Leschke, 1912): synonym of Megalacron spadicea (Fulton, 1902) 
 Papuina strabo (Brazier, 1876): synonym of Rhynchotrochus strabo (Brazier, 1876)
 Papuina tabarensis Rensch, 1933: synonym of Megalacron tabarensis (I. Rensch, 1933) (original combination)
 Papuina tayloriana (Adams & Reeve, 1850): synonym of Rhynchotrochus taylorianus (A. Adams & Reeve, 1850) (unaccepted generic combination)
 Papuina tomasinelliana (Tapparone-Canefri, 1883): synonym of Canefriula tomasinelliana (Tapparone Canefri, 1883) (superseded combination)
 Papuina wiegmanni (Martens, 1894): synonym of Rhynchotrochus wiegmanni (Martens, 1894)
 Papuina woodlarkiana (Souverbie, 1863): synonym of Rhynchotrochus woodlarkianus (Souverbie, 1863)
 Papuina xanthochila (Pfeiffer, 1861): synonym of Papustyla xanthochila (Pfeiffer, 1861)
 Papuina yulensis (Brazier, 1876): synonym of Rhynchotrochus yulensis (Brazier, 1876)

See also
 Emerald green snail

References

Description de vingt-sept espèces d'Hélices nouvelles. Revue Zoologique par la Société Cuvierienne 5: 136-141
 Martens 1860 in Albers, Helic., ed. 2, 166.
 Benthem Jutting, T. van. "Non marine Mollusca from Dutch North New Guinea: including an annotated list of the species of Papuina." Nova Guinea: résultats de l'expedition scientifique Néerlandaise à la Nouvelle-Guinée ( 17 (1933).
 Nomenclator Zoologicus info
 Pardons (2019), A new species of Papuina von Martens, 1860 from Nabire, Papua, Indonesia; The Festivus 51(4), 2019
 Bank, R. A. (2017). Classification of the Recent terrestrial Gastropoda of the World. Last update: July 16th, 2017.

External links
 Natural History Museum of Rotterdam: family Camaenidae
 Femorale : Papuina
 Iredale, T. (1941). A basic list of the land Mollusca of Papua. The Australian Zoologist. 10(1): 51-94, pls. 3-4 

Camaenidae